The 1966 United States Senate election in Tennessee was held on November 8, 1966, concurrently with other elections to the United States Senate in other states as well as elections to the United States House of Representatives and various state and local elections. Republican Howard Baker won the election, defeating Tennessee Governor Frank G. Clement. Baker became the first Republican from Tennessee to win a Senate Seat since Reconstruction.

Republican primary

Candidates
Howard Baker, Republican nominee in the 1964 United States Senate special election in Tennessee
Kenneth Roberts

Results

Democratic primary

Candidates
Frank G. Clement, Governor of Tennessee
Ross Bass, incumbent U.S. Senator

Results

General Election

Results

See also
1966 United States Senate elections

References 

1966
Tennessee
United States Senate